trans-Glutaconic acid is an organic compound with formula HO2CCH=CHCH2CO2H. This dicarboxylic acid exists as a colorless solid and is related to the saturated chemical glutaric acid, HO2CC(CH2)3CO2H.  Esters and salts of glutaconic acid are called glutaconates.

Related compounds
The geometric isomer, cis-glutaconic acid, has a noticeably lower melting point (130–132 °C). It can be prepared by bromination of levulinic acid followed by treatment of the dibromoketone with potassium carbonate.

Glutaconic anhydride, which forms by dehydration the diacid, exists mainly as the dicarbonyl tautomer in solution. It is a colorless solid melting at 77–82 °C. Either the cis or trans diacid can be used to make it: the trans form isomerizes under the reaction conditions.

Medical aspects
Glutaric, 3-hydroxyglutaric, and glutaconic acids are structurally related metabolites. In glutaric aciduria type 1, glutaconic acid accumulates, resulting in brain damage.

References

Enoic acids
Dicarboxylic acids